Odontomachus cornutus is a species of ant in the Ponerinae subfamily.

References

Ponerinae
Insects described in 1933